The following lists events that happened during 1982 in Cape Verde.

Incumbents
President: Aristides Pereira
Prime Minister: Pedro Pires

Events
April 17: Utilities company Electra established
Summer: tropical storm Beryl hit Sal and Brava

Arts and entertainment
Germano Almeida's book O dia das calças roladas published

Sports
February 11-19: the 1982 Amílcar Cabral Cup took place in Praia

Births
July 11: Emerson da Luz, footballer
July 25: Fredson Tavares, footballer

References

 
Years of the 20th century in Cape Verde
1980s in Cape Verde
Cape Verde
Cape Verde